Willis Wendell (September 2, 1858 – January 25, 1928) was an American manufacturer and politician from New York.

Life 
Wendell was born on September 2, 1858 in Amsterdam, New York. He was the son of Harmon Wendell, a drug store proprietor and knit goods manufacturer in Amsterdam, and Almira M. Mosher.

After attending Amsterdam Academy, Wendell spent the next two years in Detroit, Michigan, where he worked for a grain commission house. He then returned to Amsterdam to take charge of his father's business, and after the latter's death in 1880 he sold the business. He mainly conducted a wholesale chemical, oil, and dyestuff business, and in 1887 he began building warehouses for storing raw materials and manufactured products. By 1925, he owned five large warehouses and was the vice president of the American Broom & Brush Company, the Atlas Knitting Company, and the Amsterdam City National Bank. He was also president of the Amsterdam Automatic Telephone Company and trustee of Empire Steam Laundry Company.

In 1924, Wendell was elected to the New York State Senate as a Republican, representing New York's 39th State Senate district (Madison, Otsego, Montgomery, and Schoharie Counties). He served in the Senate in 1925 and 1926.

In 1884, Wendell married Elizabeth Herrick of Amsterdam. They had two sons, Henry and Willis Jr. He was an original trustee of the Montgomery County Historical Society and a trustee of the Green Hill Cemetery Association. He was a member of the Freemasons, the Knights of Pythias, the Elks, and the Holland Society.

Wendell died at home after a long illness on January 25, 1928. He was buried in Green Hill Cemetery.

References

External links 

 The Political Graveyard
 Willis Wendell at Find a Grave

1858 births
1928 deaths
People from Amsterdam, New York
Businesspeople from New York (state)
19th-century American businesspeople
20th-century American businesspeople
American industrialists
20th-century American politicians
Republican Party New York (state) state senators
American Freemasons
Burials in New York (state)